George Washington "Doc" Hoskins (October 1864 – January 22, 1958) was an American football player and coach of football and basketball.  He served as the head football coach at Pennsylvania State University (1892–1895), the University of Pittsburgh (1896), and Bucknell University (1899–1906, 1909), compiling a career college football record of 59–48–9.  Hoskins was also the head basketball coach at Bucknell from 1908 to 1911, tallying a mark of 21–14.

Early life
Hoskins was born in 1864 in Philadelphia, Pennsylvania.

Coaching career
Hoskins was the first head coach for the Penn State Nittany Lions football team. While the school played football from 1887 to 1891, before his arrival, Hoskins is credited for being their first coach. During his tenure from 1892 to 1895, he compiled a 17–4–4 record. His .760 winning percentage ranks highest in school history, surpassing notable coaches such as Joe Paterno, Hugo Bezdek, and Rip Engle. He lost his first college football game at the University of Pennsylvania, and tied his final game against Western Reserve University.

He followed up his career at Penn State by becoming the third-ever head coach for the Pittsburgh Panthers in 1896. By mid-November 1896, Hoskins was called upon to become the head coach of the early professional football team, the Pittsburgh Athletic Club. He tried to salvage the team's dismal season, but instead helped guide them to a 2–5–3 record.

Hoskins later served as a trainer during spring training for the Cincinnati Reds.  He died in 1958 in Cincinnati, Ohio.

Head coaching record

College football

See also
 1896 Pittsburgh Athletic Club football season
 List of college football head coaches with non-consecutive tenure

References

Additional sources
 

1864 births
1958 deaths
19th-century players of American football
American football ends
Basketball coaches from Pennsylvania
Bucknell Bison football coaches
Bucknell Bison men's basketball coaches
Cincinnati Reds personnel
Penn State Nittany Lions football coaches
Penn State Nittany Lions football players
Pittsburgh Athletic Club football coaches
Pittsburgh Panthers football coaches
Sportspeople from Philadelphia
Coaches of American football from Pennsylvania
Players of American football from Philadelphia